Route 203 is a collector road in the Canadian province of Nova Scotia.

It is located in Shelburne and Yarmouth Counties and runs through a sparsely populated area including Argyle Municipality from Shelburne at Trunk 3 along the border of the Tobeatic Wilderness Area through Kemptville and connects to Nova Scotia Route 340 at Carleton. The village of East Kemptville is the only part of a municipality in Nova Scotia disconnected from the rest of the district by roads, and accessible only from other districts via Highway 203.

Route 203 is considered the loneliest road in the province because it has the longest uninhabited stretch of any paved highway in Nova Scotia.

Communities
Carleton 
Kemptville 
East Kemptville
Sluice Point
Flintstone Rock
Welshtown 
Upper Ohio 
Middle Ohio
Lower Ohio
Shelburne

Parks & Protected Area
The Islands Provincial Park
Tobeatic Wilderness Area
Indian Fields Provincial Park Reserve

Businesses
Trout Point Lodge of Nova Scotia
Kemptville Corner Store
Black Bull Resources White Rock Mine

See also
List of Nova Scotia provincial highways

References

Nova Scotia provincial highways
Roads in Shelburne County, Nova Scotia
Roads in Yarmouth County